The following is a list of countries that have Hindustani as an official language.

Official language

Minority language

See also 
 Geolinguistics
 Language geography

References